Route 210 is a highway in western Missouri with an eastern terminus at Route 10 southwest of Richmond and a western terminus at Interstate 29, 35, and U.S. Route 71.  After I-29 and 35, 210 immediately intersects Highway 1 and continues east. It intersects Walker Road in front of NKC Hospital and the Cerner world headquarters before an interchange with Chouteau Trafficway.   It becomes a limited access freeway as it exits North Kansas City and into Kansas City proper.  There are interchanges with North Brighton Avenue and Northeast Searcy Creek Parkway before it intersects I-435.  Here, it reverts to a four-lane road with stoplights.  It has intersections with the frontage road, Great Midwest Drive, and Eldon Road before becoming a two-lane road and going onto the river bottoms.  It goes straight east, intersecting several roads, before curving northeast to intersect with Route 291.

Major intersections

References

210
Transportation in Clay County, Missouri
Transportation in Jackson County, Missouri
Transportation in Ray County, Missouri